The Marcos LM500 is a high-performance racing-oriented version of the Marcos Mantara road car, designed, developed and built by British manufacturer Marcos Engineering, for sports car racing between 1994 and 2001.

References

Grand tourer racing cars